Byersville is an unincorporated community and census-designated place (CDP) in the town of West Sparta, Livingston County, New York, United States. As of the 2010 census, its population was 47. The ZIP Code is 14517.

Demographics

Notes

Census-designated places in New York (state)
Census-designated places in Livingston County, New York